Alexei Valeryevich Yashin (born 5 November 1973) is a Russian former professional ice hockey centre who played 12 seasons in the National Hockey League (NHL) for the Ottawa Senators and New York Islanders, serving as captain of both teams. He also played nine seasons in the Russian Superleague (RSL) and Kontinental Hockey League (KHL) for Dynamo Moscow, CSKA Moscow, Lokomotiv Yaroslavl and SKA Saint Petersburg. He was inducted into the IIHF Hall of Fame in 2020.

Playing career

Ottawa Senators (1993–2001)
Yashin received his initial fame for being the first draft pick in the history of the expansion Ottawa Senators (second overall in the 1992 NHL Entry Draft). After remaining in Russia for the 1992–93 season with Dynamo Moscow, Yashin arrived in Ottawa for the 1993–94 NHL season, along with Ottawa's other highly touted young draft selection, Alexandre Daigle. Yashin soon eclipsed Daigle as the team's brightest young star, scoring 79 points in his rookie season and earning a nomination for the Calder Memorial Trophy.

Subsequent seasons saw him emerge as a star player in the NHL, helping Ottawa make the Stanley Cup playoffs for the first time in 1997. In the 1998 playoffs, he scored a key overtime goal against the New Jersey Devils that helped the Senators win their first ever playoff series.

Yashin was eventually named team captain of the Senators, and the pinnacle of his career came in the 1998–99 season when he scored 94 points. At the conclusion of the season, Yashin was runner-up for both the Hart Memorial Trophy for the NHL's most valuable player, as well as being named an NHL second team All-Star. Yashin's regular season success did not carry over into the 1999 playoffs, and the Senators were swept in the first round by the Buffalo Sabres.

Contract disputes
Off the ice, Yashin's time in Ottawa was tumultuous. Senators' management initially viewed Daigle, who had been selected first overall in the 1993 NHL Entry Draft, as the franchise's cornerstone player. While they hesitated in offering Yashin a five-year, $4 million contract, they signed Daigle to one of the largest rookie contracts in history and touted him over Yashin for the Calder Memorial Trophy at the conclusion of the 1993–94 season. Several nasty contract disputes later developed between Yashin and the team, beginning when Yashin refused to honour his contract at the onset of the 1995–96 season, unless the terms were renegotiated to make him the team's highest-paid player. The holdout caused many Senators' fans to sour on him. Some commentators have sympathized with Yashin's position in the dispute, as Daigle had struggled on the ice in contrast with Yashin's performances. Yashin's offensive numbers exceeded Daigle's in every season they played together on the Senators.

In 1998, Yashin initially pledged to give $1 million to the National Arts Centre in Ottawa, the Centre's largest ever donation. The Senators had earlier collaborated with the NAC to produce the 1998–99 season program titled "Symphony on Ice", which featured Senators head coach Jacques Martin on the front cover wearing a tuxedo and waving a conductor's baton, while NAC music director Pinchas Zukerman was shown in the Senators' locker room with a #00 Senators jersey. When the NAC learned that one of the conditions of this donation was for them to pay Yashin's parents $425,000 in consulting fees for "loosely defined" services, they balked and Yashin cancelled the donation. The failed arrangement was a public relations disaster for Yashin and his family, and served to further damage Yashin's already strained relationship with the Ottawa public.

Yashin's relationship with the Senators reached a new low after the 1998–99 season—he refused to honour the final year of his contract and demanded a pay raise (he would have earned $3.6 million that year, compared to other star centremen in the NHL such as Steve Yzerman and Joe Sakic, who made $6–7 million). When the Senators refused, Yashin demanded a trade on the advice of his agent, Mark Gandler. This was the third time that Yashin demanded a new contract during his five years with the team. The Senators refused to trade Yashin, instead stripping him of his captaincy and issuing it to Daniel Alfredsson. When Yashin still refused to report, the Senators suspended him for the remainder of the 1999–2000 season on 10 November, with the full support of the NHL. Yashin attempted to sign with a team in Switzerland, but the International Ice Hockey Federation (IIHF) suspended him from playing internationally until the dispute was resolved. After the season, an NHL arbitrator refused to grant Yashin the free agent status he claimed to have earned, instead tolling his contract for another season on the grounds that Yashin owed the Senators the final year of his contract if he ever returned to the NHL. It was another public relations disaster for Yashin.

Yashin returned to the Senators for the 2000–01 season. Despite being jeered by the crowd in every NHL arena, including Ottawa, Yashin had a solid regular season offensively. The Senators entered the playoffs as the second seed in the Eastern Conference and were paired against the seventh-seeded Toronto Maple Leafs. Yashin had a poor series and did not attend the final team meeting, held after the Senators' early playoff exit.

New York Islanders (2001–2007)

On draft day, 2001, Yashin was sent to the New York Islanders in exchange for defenceman Zdeno Chára, forward Bill Muckalt and the second overall draft selection, which the Senators used to draft highly touted centre Jason Spezza. Islanders' general manager Mike Milbury promptly re-signed Yashin to an enormous ten-year, $87.5 million contract. Although his contract was reduced by 24% due to the new NHL Collective Bargaining Agreement (CBA) signed in 2005, Yashin was widely considered to be grossly overpaid and virtually untradeable.

After joining the Islanders, Yashin's point production declined. While he helped his new team make the playoffs for the first time in eight years in 2001–02, the Islanders were still unable to advance beyond the first round. The Isles lost to the Toronto Maple Leafs in a hard-fought seven game series in 2001–02 and then lost in five games to Ottawa in 2002–03 and the eventual champion Tampa Bay Lightning in 2003–04. Yashin's play was generally praised in 2001–02, as he carried the team's offence for stretches during the season. The following years, his mediocre point production led people both inside and outside the Islanders organization to question his effort and salary.

Prior to the 2005–06 season, the Islanders lost several key players to free agency or retirement and significantly retooled their roster. Captain Michael Peca was traded to free up room to sign free agents such as high-scoring wing Miroslav Šatan and Yashin became team captain. Journalists suggested that the team had finally been built around Yashin and would sink or swim with his performance. A common defence of Yashin's decreased offensive output had been the lack of a legitimate first line winger to play with him. Šatan and Yashin showed signs of chemistry early in the season, but generally produced disappointing results. When Šatan was moved off Yashin's line, his offensive output increased markedly. After the season ended with the Islanders out of the playoffs for the first time since his arrival, Yashin acknowledged that he needed to score more. After the season ended, there had been speculation that the Islanders would buy out his contract and rebuild in a different image, but the team decided to retain him.

An October 2006 article in Newsday suggested that Yashin must "make a difference" in 2006–07 or he will be bought out at the end of the season. By the 20-game mark, Yashin was earning praise in the local media for the first time in recent memory, and his point totals were among the league leaders. On 25 November 2006, Yashin suffered a knee sprain after taking a knee-to-knee hit. He initially returned after a few weeks, but his effectiveness was reduced, and the team revealed that the knee was not 100%. Early in February, Islanders head coach Ted Nolan decided to rest Yashin until his knee was completely healthy, which prompted questions about whether the team still had faith in Yashin and whether the re-injury was legitimate or a pretext for benching him.

Yashin finally returned to the line-up on 8 March 2007, recording 13 points (five goals and eight assists) in 16 games which helped the Islanders clinch the eighth and final playoff berth in the Eastern Conference. In the first round series against the Buffalo Sabres, Yashin registered no points in five games and at times was demoted to the fourth line by head coach Ted Nolan. The Islanders decided to buy-out the remainder of Yashin's contract in June 2007, according to a report in Newsday. The contract was bought-out for $17.63 million, or two-thirds of the amount left on the contract, to be paid out over eight years at a rate of $2.2 million per year.

Return to Russia (2007–2012)
Perhaps surprisingly, Yashin's agent, Mark Gandler, claimed that Yashin was keen on a return to Ottawa once his contract had been bought-out by the Islanders. "It's a new chapter and we'll be calling Ottawa for sure," Gandler was quoted in the Ottawa Sun as saying, adding, "He'd love to return to Ottawa, in fact." However, the Senators showed little to no interest in bringing Yashin back into the fold, and Gandler was subsequently "not happy with" contract offers from various NHL teams, resulting in threats of his client returning to Russia to resume his hockey career. On 20 July 2007, Yashin signed a one-year contract with Lokomotiv Yaroslavl of the Russian Superleague (RSL).

On 29 May 2009, it was announced that Yashin had signed with SKA Saint Petersburg of the Kontinental Hockey League (KHL). This news came several months after he helped Lokomotiv Yaroslavl reach the seventh game of the Gagarin Cup final, which they lost 1–0. That season, he also led the team in both regular season as well playoff scoring, with 47 points (21 goals and 26 assists) in 56 regular season games, and 18 points (7 goals and 11 assists) in 19 playoff games.

During the summer of 2011, the New York Islanders and Yashin discussed the possibility of Yashin returning to play for the team in the 2011–12 season. Ultimately, the two sides failed to come to terms and Yashin subsequently signed a one-year deal with CSKA Moscow for the 2011–12 season. Following the 2011–12 season, Yashin retired.

Management career
In December 2012, Russian Hockey Federation president Vladislav Tretiak appointed Yashin as the general manager of the Russia women's national ice hockey team.

International play

On the international stage, Yashin has represented his native Russia in the 1996 and 2004 World Cup of Hockey and the 1998, 2002, and 2006 Winter Olympics. He has won Olympic silver (1998) and bronze (2002) medals.

He was inducted into the IIHF Hall of Fame in 2020. The induction ceremony was scheduled during the 2020 IIHF World Championship, but was delayed due to the COVID-19 pandemic. The IIHF Hall of Fame class of 2020/2022 was inducted during the 2022 IIHF World Championship.

Personal life
Yashin is not related to legendary Soviet and Russian football goalkeeper Lev Yashin.

He was in a long-term relationship with actress and former model Carol Alt.

Career statistics

Regular season and playoffs

International

Awards and honors

References

External links

 

1973 births
Avtomobilist Yekaterinburg players
HC CSKA Moscow players
HC Dynamo Moscow players
Ice hockey players at the 1998 Winter Olympics
Ice hockey players at the 2002 Winter Olympics
Ice hockey players at the 2006 Winter Olympics
Las Vegas Thunder players
Living people
Lokomotiv Yaroslavl players
Medalists at the 1998 Winter Olympics
Medalists at the 2002 Winter Olympics
National Hockey League All-Stars
National Hockey League first-round draft picks
New York Islanders players
Olympic bronze medalists for Russia
Olympic ice hockey players of Russia
Olympic medalists in ice hockey
Olympic silver medalists for Russia
Ottawa Senators draft picks
Ottawa Senators players
Russian ice hockey centres
SKA Saint Petersburg players
Sportspeople from Yekaterinburg